Chhabi Biswas  (13 July 1900 – 11 June 1962) was an Indian actor, primarily known for his performances in Tapan Sinha's Kabuliwala and Satyajit Ray's films Jalshaghar (The Music Room, 1958), Devi (The Goddess, 1960) and Kanchenjungha (1962).

He is best remembered for his numerous roles as the quintessential aristocratic patriarch, and was himself the scion of a rich and cultured North Kolkata family. He was born on 12 July 1900. His father, Bhupatinath Biswas, was well known for his charitable works. His first name was Sachindranath, but his mother nicknamed her handsome son Chhabi (a beautiful picture!) and the name stuck throughout his life and career. His portrayal of the formidable father figure, though often typecast, yet was powerful and convincing enough to earn both popular and critical accolades. That portrayal was culturally significant, too as in the British Raj, enlightened Bengali used to combined both the hoary tradition and the Anglicised urbanity.

Life and film career
Passing his matriculation examinations from the Hindu School, Chhabi Biswas enrolled at the Presidency College and later at the Vidyasagar College. It was during this time he entered amateur theatre and got in touch with  Sisir Kumar Bhaduri, the legendary star of Bengali theatre. The young actor was impressed by Sisir Kumar’s histrionic abilities and he became heavily involved with several amateur theatrical clubs. His powerful performance as Sri Gouranga in the play Nader Nimai sealed Biswas's popularity among the theatre lovers of the day.

He then took a break from acting and joined an insurance company, and later started a business dealing in jute products. But soon, unable to resist the temptations of the stage, Biswas rejoined the theatre circuit and made his debut as a professional actor in a social-melodrama, Samaj. Even after his success as a film actor Biswas continued his association with the professional stage and Jatra circuit. His performance in major roles in hit plays like Shoroshi (1940), Sita (1940), Kedar Roy (1941) and Shahjehan (1941), made him an admired figure both among the audience and his peers.

In 1936, Biswas made his cinematic debut in a film called Annapurnar Mandir. The film was directed by Tinkari Chakraborty and Biswas played the role of Bishu, the husband of the heroine. Trained in the over-melodramatic acting style of the contemporary Bengali stage, Biswas soon grasped the finer nuances of acting for cinema. He became a regular in films produced by the New Theatres and had major roles in Chokker Bali (1937), Nimai Sannyas (1940) and Pratisruti (1941). He was absolutely marvellous as a 90-year-old ascetic in Debaki Bose's film Nartaki (1940). Ironically, it was the success of his acting in Nartaki that limited his opportunities in lead roles but his reputation as a character actor par excellence was by now firmly in place. Biswas's second innings as an actor began with this film and he almost became an automatic choice as the paterfamilias or the suave noble. Using his perfect English diction to the hilt Biswas (along with Pahadi Sanyal and Bikash Roy to a certain extent) developed a unique way of delivering a dramatic dialogue, first in English, and then after a pause repeating the same in Bengali. Films such as Ashok (1942), Parineeta (1942), Dwanda (1943), Matir Ghar (1944), Dui Purush (1945), Biraj Bou (1946) and Mandana (1950) showcased his talents as an actor of great quality.

In 1958, when Satyajit Ray needed someone to play an aging aristocrat in Jalsaghar, Biswas was an automatic choice. Subsequently, Biswas starred in two more Ray films; Devi (1960) and Kanchenjungha (1962).

Chhabi Biswas died at age 61 in an automobile accident on 11 June 1962. Satyajit Ray later wrote, "Jalsgahar, Devi, Kanchenjunga, were all written with Chhabi Biswas in mind. Ever since he died, I have not written a single middle-aged part that calls for a high degree of professional talent."

Filmography

Awards and recognitions
 Sangeet Natak Akademi Award in 1960

References

Notes

Citations

External links

Biography and Filmography at Calcuttaweb.com

1900 births
1962 deaths
Bengali male actors
Male actors in Bengali cinema
Road incident deaths in India
Recipients of the Sangeet Natak Akademi Award
Presidency University, Kolkata alumni
Hindu School, Kolkata alumni
Vidyasagar College alumni
University of Calcutta alumni
20th-century Indian male actors
Male actors from Kolkata
Bengali film directors
Film directors from Kolkata
20th-century Indian film directors